Gastric pits are indentations in the stomach which denote entrances to 3-5 tubular shaped gastric glands. They are deeper in the pylorus than they are in the other parts of the stomach. The human stomach has several million of these pits which dot the surface of the lining epithelium.  Surface mucous cells line the pits themselves but give way to a series of other types of cells which then line the glands themselves.

Gastric acid
Gastric acid also known as gastric juice is secreted from gastric glands, which are located in narrow tube like structures called gastric pits. Gastric juice contains hydrochloric acid, pepsinogen and mucus in a healthy adult. Hydrochloric acid is secreted by parietal cells, pepsinogen is secreted by gastric chief cells and mucus is secreted by mucus neck cells.

References

External links
  - "Digestive System: Alimentary Canal: esophageal/stomach junction"
 Slideshow at trinity.edu
 Slide at pathology.iupui.edu
 Slide at ucsd.edu
 Slide at nhmccd.edu

Pits